Madame Gagné was a photographer who worked between 1886 and 1891 in Montreal, Quebec, Canada. She and her husband, Édouard C. Gagné (also a photographer) had a total of three studios over time. At least one of her prints can be found at Montreal's McCord Museum.

Madame Gagné reportedly had a rapport with the new Chinese immigrants to Montreal, and often made portraits of them and their families. Since most photographers of the time catered to more well-to-do clients, this was an unusual custom.

Her photography studio was located at 211 Saint Laurent Boulevard, which is in the heart of today's Old Montreal.

References

External links 

 Portrait by Madame Gagne
 Another portrait
  — A brief discussion of Mme. Gagné’s photo in the McCord Museum

Canadian women photographers
19th-century Canadian photographers
19th-century women photographers
Year of birth uncertain
Year of death unknown